Wendell B. Harris Jr. (born March 5, 1954), is a Juilliard- and Interlochen-trained American filmmaker and actor. He is the writer, director and lead actor of Chameleon Street, which won the Grand Jury prize at the 1990 Sundance Film Festival. Harris and Prismatic Images went on to produce a radio series entitled Black Biography, which showcased black icons from the spheres of art, history, and politics. He has appeared as an actor in the films Out of Sight (1998) and Road Trip (2000). Harris is currently in post-production for the forthcoming documentary Arbiter Roswell, a 14-year project chronicling the relationship between public opinion, the media, and the military-industrial complex.

References

External links

1954 births
Living people
American male film actors
African-American film directors
American film directors
African-American male actors
21st-century African-American people
20th-century African-American people